Benny Bell (born Benjamin Samberg, March 21, 1906 – July 6, 1999) was an American singer-songwriter who reached popularity in the 1940s, with a comeback in the 1970s. He is remembered for his risqué but cheerfully optimistic songs.

Career
Benny Bell was born to an immigrant Jewish family in New York City. His father wanted him to be a rabbi, but after trying various odd jobs including self-employed street peddler, he decided to pursue a career in vaudeville and music, sometimes under the names Benny Bimbo and Paul Wynn. His first record, "The Alimony Blues" (backed with "Fast Asleep on a Mountain"), for Plaza Records on December 16, 1929 was a comical song about preferring to spend time in jail rather than pay alimony. He went on to write approximately 600 songs, most of which are documented in his many notebooks, ledgers and copyright papers.

In addition to songs with English lyrics, he wrote and recorded in Yiddish and Hebrew, sometimes mixing two or three languages in one song (e.g. "Bar Mitzvah Boy" which uses three). According to liner notes on his albums, these songs should be understood by listeners who speak any of the languages.

Bell founded his own record company under a variety of names: Bell Enterprises, Madison Records, Zion Records, and Kosher Comedy Records. He also wrote and recorded commercial jingles for radio. His jingle for Lemke's cockroach powder, sung in a mixture of Yiddish and English, has been released on record.

Bell enjoyed writing risqué lyrics, and in 1939 he was advised that he could make so-called party records with "blue" lyrics, primarily for use in jukeboxes in cocktail bars. He entered into this endeavour using his self-established record company, while continuing to make ethnic and mainstream comedy records. In an interview on the Dr. Demento radio program, Bell stated that he kept his straight and blue careers separate for many years, the latter being a secret. His eventual fame would come from his risqué material. His first jukebox release was a hot jazz arrangement of a traditional risqué drinking song, "Sweet Violets", but his first big success in this field was an original song, "Take a Ship for Yourself".

In 1946, he released his three highest-selling songs: "Take a Ship for Yourself," "Pincus the Peddler" which drew from his personal experience in the trade, and the notorious "Shaving Cream". "Pincus the Peddler" became Bell's signature tune, despite the title character's disreputable violent tendencies, and it concludes with his deportation to Petrograd (now Saint Petersburg, Russia). Each verse in "Shaving Cream" ends with a mind rhyme of shit, the initial sh- segueing into the refrain, "Shaving Cream, be nice and clean..." The same technique was used in "Sweet Violets" and many other songs — it is known among folklorists as "teasing songs".

He continued recording and releasing records into the 1980s, but he remained little-known beyond New York City until the 1970s when "Shaving Cream" was played regularly on the Dr. Demento radio program, leading to its re-issue as a single in 1975 on the Vanguard Records label, along with a similarly titled album. The single reached No. 30 in the US and No. 57 in Australia. Around this time, Bell was writing songs about topics such as disco and the Watergate scandal.

Bell continued self-releasing vinyl albums into the 1980s, and they often resemble 1950s releases, featuring somewhat plain covers with the same graphics (an array of laughing heads) re-used for decades, or with no art except a plain cover with hole to view the label. He continued to issue 10-inch albums long after that format was considered obsolete. Some albums have new spoken jokes edited into breaks in older songs as "asides", a technique Bell had been using since the 1950s, and some songs contain comic interruptions made over several decades.

In the early 1990s Bell appeared at the Bottom Line with Doctor Demento and Weird Al Yankovic.

A book called Grandpa Had a Long One: Personal Notes on the Life, Career and Legacy of Benny Bell, which is a combination biography and memoir written by his grandson, Joel Samberg, was published by BearManor Media and released in 2009. Joel Samberg, who collaborated with his grandfather on a few recordings and videos in the 1970s and 1980s, also recorded several new versions of "Shaving Cream" after Benny Bell's death, using his grandfather's music with updated lyrics. These include "Presidential Shaving Cream," which skewered the presidential and vice presidential candidates in 2008, and "Holiday Shaving Cream," which paints potent pictures of Christmas and Chanukkah traditions.

In 1995, Bell suffered a fall and was admitted to Good Samaritan Hospital in Suffern, New York.
 
Bell died in New York in July 1999, at the age of 93. His son, Charles Samberg, donated the vast majority of Bell's works to Florida Atlantic University in Boca Raton, Florida.

Albums discography
Kosher Comedy (Kosher Comedy Records, 1956)
Kosher Comedy (Zion Records 126, 1956, not the same album as above)
Kosher Comedy (Madison Records 120, 1960, not the same album as either of the above)
Jewish Comedy (1st Issue) (Bell Enterprises, 10-inch album)
Jewish Comedy (2nd Issue) (Bell Enterprises, 10-inch album, essentially a "volume 2")
Jewish American Novelty Tunes (Bell Enterprises, 1958)
Pincus the Peddler (Zion Records 234, 1959, re-issue of above, as Benny Bell and the Agony Trio)
To the Bride: "G'zint mit Parnussa" (Zion Records 252, as Benny Bell and the Brownsville Klezmers)
Laugh Along With Pincus (Madison Records 523, re-issued with different cover in 1972)
The Opera Star (Comic Opera) (Bell Enterprises 900, 10-inch album)
Be a Comedian (1958, re-issued as Bell Enterprises BB-801, 1961, 10-inch instructional album)
Shaving Cream (Vanguard Records VSD-79357, 1975)
Showtime (Bell Enterprises 303, 1977, jokes by Slim Jim and songs by Benny Bell)
The Hilarious Musical Comedy of Benny Bell (volumes 1 to 8, Benny Bell Records, on CD)
Benny Bell: Another Close Shave (Benny Bell, 2005)

Further reading
Joel Samberg, "Grandpa Had a Long One: Personal Notes on the Life, Career and Legacy of Benny Bell," BearManor Media, 2009
Roland L. Smith, Goldmine Comedy Record Price Guide. Krause Publications, 1996.
Ronald L. Smith, Comedy Stars at 78 RPM: Biographies and discographies of 89 American and British recording artists, 1896–1946. Jefferson, NC: McFarland & Co., 1998.
The Encyclopedia of Popular Music. Third edition. Edited by Colin Larkin. London: MUZE, 1998. Grove's Dictionaries, New York, 1998.

See also
List of 1970s one-hit wonders in the United States

References

External links
[ Benny Bell] at AllMusic
Judaica Sound Archives at Florida Atlantic University, with online recordings courtesy of Bell's estate

1906 births
1999 deaths
Jewish American musicians
Songwriters from New York (state)
American novelty song performers
Singers from New York City
20th-century American singers
Burials at New Montefiore Cemetery
20th-century American male singers
Yiddish-language singers of the United States
Hebrew-language singers of the United States
20th-century American Jews
American male songwriters